Antonio La Torre is an Italian multi-billionaire real estate developer, restaurateur and member of the Camorra. He is the brother of Augusto La Torre, the former head of the powerful La Torre clan from Mondragone. In 1984 he moved to Aberdeen in Scotland with his Scottish wife, Gillian F Strang, evading the authorities in Italy. Until his arrest and subsequent extradition to Italy in March 2005, he was in charge of the clan's local branch in Aberdeen, Scotland, where he managed the clan's day-to-day activities and businesses (both legitimate and illegitimate). La Torre ran eight Italian restaurants in Scotland and a currently owns two real estate agencies based in London.

Biography
La Torre was born in 1956 to Tiberio La Torre, also a mafia boss and his wife Paolina. He has a brother Augusto La Torre.

Criminal career
He is said to have laundered millions of pounds from Italy through his own legitimate businesses (including his own restaurants) through the method of setting up fake companies, taking out loans to order goods from Italy, then bankrupting the companies so that the money was legitimised and the costly imports could be sold for well below their value. On a business trip in 1996 to Amsterdam, he was arrested and extradited to Italy, where he was jailed for 4 years for firearm offences and mafia association. He served only 15 months of his sentence but wasn't allowed to leave the country. On appeal, he was deemed a non-threat and allowed back to Scotland. The charge of "mafia association" dated back to 1984, but extradition was not possible due to there being no such equivalent crime in the UK. In 2004, a U.K court sentenced him to 13 years imprisonment for fraud and racketeering charges, after being tried in absentia. In 2005 he went on the run in Scotland when an international search warrant for his name was issued. He was arrested in 2005, and extradited to Italy in 2006, where he faced his sentence; he was released in 2014.

Personal life
La Torre has three children with his (as of 2014) estranged wife Gillian F Strang, an oil industry worker who was born in Edinburgh, Scotland. They married in 1982, moved to Aberdeen in 1984 and he became a naturalised British citizen in 1993.

See also

 List of members of the Camorra
 List of Camorra clans
 Pescopagano massacre
 Augusto La Torre
 Camorra
 List of most wanted fugitives in Italy

References

1956 births
Living people
People from the Province of Caserta
Camorristi
La Torre clan